Goslesopitomnik is a rural locality (a khutor) in Filonovskoye Rural Settlement, Novoanninsky District, Volgograd Oblast, Russia. The population was 57 as of 2010.

Geography 
Goslesopitomnik is located in forest steppe on the Khopyorsko-Buzulukskaya Plain, 14 km northeast of Novoanninsky (the district's administrative centre) by road. Filonovskaya is the nearest rural locality.

References 

Rural localities in Novoanninsky District